Weymer's crow (Euploea latifasciata) is a species of nymphalid butterfly, endemic to Indonesia.

References

Euploea
Butterflies of Indonesia
Endemic fauna of Indonesia
Butterflies described in 1885
Taxonomy articles created by Polbot